Rasganço is a 2001 Portuguese drama film directed by Raquel Freire. It was released on 30 November.

Cast
Ana Teresa Carvalhosa
Isabel Ruth
Paula Marques
Ricardo Aibéo
Paulo Rocha
Luís Miguel Cintra
Ivo Ferreira
Ana Brandão
Ana Moreira
Lúcia Sigalho

Reception
On Público, Vasco Câmara gave it 3 out of 5 stars and Luís Miguel Oliveira gave it 2 out of 5.

References

External links

2001 drama films
2001 films
Portuguese drama films